Peekaboo is a 2011 Australian short film written and directed by Damien Power, and produced by Joe Weatherstone.

The film was a finalist in the Dendy Awards for Australian Short Films at the 2011 Sydney Film Festival.

Synopsis

On the train home from the Easter Show, an over-tired little girl is hyped-up by a stranger, who plays a game of peekaboo with her, until her mother begins to feel disturbed by the interest he's showing. A short time later, the girl disappears in a carpark and her desperate mother searches. A glimpse of the man from the train fires her imagination, with devastating consequences.

Production

 The filmmakers raised the film's entire $5,500 budget through crowd-funding online.
 Peekaboo was filmed on location in Sydney, Australia, over three days in June 2010.
 The film was shot on a Canon 5D DSLR with Canon 24-70mm, 70-200mm and 16-35mm lenses, and a Zacuto shoulder rig with an onboard monitor. DOP Simon Chapman chose to use zoom lenses over prime lenses in order find shots very quickly, because of the very young actors in the cast. All the interiors were shot at 1000ASA, which meant they could be shot primarily with available light.
 The film was finished in May 2011.

Cast

 Justine Clarke as Jillian
 Alan Dukes as Man
 Marisa Bedwell as Marisa
 Marli Bedwell as Marli

Reception

Tom Goodwin from the Co-Op Post wrote, "Short, direct and surprisingly brutal in its finale, Peekaboo stood head and shoulders above most of the other entries on display."

Matt Riveria gave Peekaboo 4/5 stars in the 2011 Sydney Film Festival Critics Poll.

Festivals and awards

 Finalist - Dendy Awards for Australian Short Films - Sydney Film Festival 2011
 In competition – Melbourne International Film Festival, Australia, 2011
 WINNER AUDIENCE AWARD – Canberra Short Film Festival, Australia, 2011
 Official Selection – Wide Angle Short Film Showcase – Busan International Film Festival, South Korea, 2011 (international premiere)
 WINNER BEST TASMANIAN SHORT FILM – BOFA Film Festival, Launceston, Australia, 2011
 WINNER SHOWTIME TALENT ASSIST AWARD – SPAA, Australia, 2011
 WINNER BEST EDITING – Flickerfest, Sydney, Australia, 2012
 WINNER SBS AWARD / WINNER BEST EDITING / WINNER AUDIENCE AWARD – 18th World of Women's Cinema Festival, Sydney, Australia, 2012
 WINNER BEST FILM JUDGED BY INDUSTRY – West End Film Festival, Brisbane, Australia, 2012
 HONOURABLE MENTION – Australian Film Festival, Sydney, Australia, 2012
 WINNER BEST AUSTRALIAN FILM – Mudgee International Short Film Festival, Mudgee, Australia, 2012
 WINNER PEOPLE’S CHOICE AWARD / WINNER EMERGING SCREENWRITER – Shorts Film Festival, Adelaide, Australia, 2012
 NOMINATED BEST FILM – St. Kilda Film Festival, Melbourne, Australia, 2012
 Official Selection – Dungog Film Festival, Australia, 2012
 In competition – Seattle International Film Festival, 2012 (US premiere)
 In competition- Ladahk International Film Festival, India, 2012
 AICE Australian Film Festival – Haifa, Jerusalem, Tel Aviv, Israel, 2012
 Official Selection – Revelation Perth International Film Festival, Australia, 2012
 Official Selection – BUSHO – Budapest International Short Film Festival, Budapest, Hungary, 2012
 Official Selection - Scone Short Film Festival, Scone, Australia, 2012
 In competition - Rome International Film Festival, Georgia, USA, 2012
 In competition – LAShortsFest, Los Angeles, USA, 2012
 In competition – Milwaukee Film Festival, USA, 2012
 WINNER BEST DIRECTOR – Miami Short Film Festival, USA, 2012
 In competition – Milwaukee Short Film Festival, USA, 2012
 In competition – Cockatoo Island Film Festival, Australia, 2012
 WINNER BEST SUSPENSE FILM – Couchfest, various USA, 2012
 In competition – Tallgrass International Film Festival, Wichita, USA, 2012
 In competition – St. Louis International Film Festival, USA, 2012
 NOMINATED – BEST EDITING IN A SHORT FILM – Australian Screen Editors Guild, 2012
 In competition – Dallas International Film Festival, USA, 2013
 WINNER PRIX DE LA MEILLEURE RÉALISATION (BEST DIRECTION) – Courts des îles Festival, Tahiti, 2013

References

External links 
 Official Website
 Official Facebook Page
 The Co-Op Post Review 
 IF Awards Page
 Sydney Film Festival - Peekaboo
 Sydney Film Festival - Peekaboo Q&A

2011 short films
Australian short films